Swimming at the 2013 Islamic Solidarity Games was held in Jaka Baring Swimming Stadium in Palembang from 24 to 29 September 2013.

Medalists

Men

Women

Medal table

References

Complete Results

External links
 2013 Islamic Solidarity Games Results

Islamic Solidarity Games
2013 Islamic Solidarity Games
2013 Islamic Solidarity Games
2013